Ellen Rochefort (born 22 November 1954) is a Canadian long-distance runner. She competed in the women's marathon at the 1988 Summer Olympics.

References

1954 births
Living people
Athletes (track and field) at the 1988 Summer Olympics
Canadian female long-distance runners
Canadian female marathon runners
Olympic track and field athletes of Canada
Sportspeople from Quebec